Halimaw is a horror anthology Filipino film directed by Christopher de Leon (credited as Christopher Strauss de Leon) and Mario O’Hara. The film is released on December 25, 1986, as part of the Metro Manila Film Festival and produced by NCV films, the film is divided in two stories; ‘Komiks’ and ’Halimaw sa Banga.’

‘Komiks’ tells the story of a young child who stole a comic book from a mysterious house, the segment is written and screenplay by Uro dela Cruz. ‘Halimaw sa Banga’ is about an evil spirit living in a jar, in a wealthy household, the segment is written and screenplay by Frank Rivera and Mario O'Hara.
'Komiks' is the directorial debut of Christopher de Leon. Siblings, Ian and Lotlot de Leon both starred as each of the story's lead, they are also Christopher de Leon and Nora Aunor's, who served as the film's executive producer, offspring.

Plot

Komiks 
Two youthful friends, Cocoy (Ian de Leon) and Nonoy (Monossi Mempin) stumble upon an abandoned house. The two enter the house and the door locks itself. A scared and reluctant Nonoy tried to escape while Cocoy explores the house. He is slowly attracted in a mysterious room. He enters and opens a chest containing a comic entitled ‘Komiks 1927.’ While trying to find his friend, Nonoy keeps injuring himself. The two find an open window and escape with Cocoy stealing the comics. At home, Cocoy is enjoying himself with the found comics, but he notices that the domesticated horses are acting bizarre. Cocoy's younger sister, Anna is a nosy brat while his parents (Gina Pareno and Jaime Fabregas) are strict and neglectful parents. The comic tells a tale of a king named Visgoth from the kingdom of Anadrapura. He challenged his two greatest knights: Argoknox and Gorkrah, who are courting his daughter and the princess of Anadrapura. The two knights are equal until the final challenge, since Gorkrah wished for a powerful sword from the evil species of Malignoids in exchange of his soul. He defeats Argoknox and gets married with the princess. But Gorkrah found out that the sword is lustful of blood and chaos ensues in the kingdom. The old hermits assign a young man named Joth to find Argoknox, who is the only one who can bring back peace to the kingdom. Joth, after going through various obstacles, finds a phrase that brings Argoknax back to life. Argoknax and Gorkrah faces again but before Cocoy can finish the story, he is interrupted by his sister for supper. During the dinner, a mysterious noise is heard from the ceiling.

While Cocoy is sleeping, Gorkrah (Ruel Vernah) comes out of the comics and escapes from the house. The next day, Cocoy tells Nonoy about the comics and they found out that the following pages are unfinished however, the comics is confiscated by a teacher. Later, a couple in a park is attacked by Gorkrah. Cocoy is scolded by his father and received severe punishment for the comics. On a broadcast news, the couple's incident is reported and Cocoy recognizes the same mark from the couple's arm and the one from the comics. Gorkrah is later seen feeding on the horses at the house. In the middle of the night, Cocoy is disturbed by the Gorkrah. Cocoy's father tries to confront but is thrown on the floor. The parents are now being attacked while Cocoy and Anna are now seeing it. Cocoy summons Argoknox by saying the same phrase that was written in the comics. Argoknox (Michael de Mesa) faces Gorkrah via sword fight which led outside of the house. The fight concludes and Argoknox wins. He reveals himself to be the writer and thanks Cocoy for keeping his world alive and then disappears. The next morning, Cocoy and his father goes back to the abandoned house and returns the comics in the chest.

Halimaw sa Banga 
In an archaeological excavation. An expensive ‘banga’ jar is illegally bought by a lawyer named Margarita (Liza Lorena). Unbeknownst to her, the jar is home by an evil spirit who was burnt alive and crucified. On the night of her sister Regina's wake, her mother (Mary Walter), nephews; Toni (Lotlot de Leon) and Marlyn are in attendance. Toni is Regina's daughter. Margarita's mother asks her where Abe; her husband who also happens to be her sister's survived husband, is and he might be fooling around. While some of the visitor's kids are playing hide and seek, a boy hides inside the jar and gets consumed by the monster. The same night, Abe (Mario O’Hara) comes home to Margarita but declines him for being absent and flaky. Marital issues rise in the next days. When Pabling, a house crew witnesses the monster's hand coming out, he alerts the whole household, but nobody believes him. He tried to break the jar later but gets consumed by the monster. Each consumption of the monster frees herself from the pins that has been hindering her. Marlyn moves in with Toni and Margarita while Margarita hires a private investigator and catches photos of Abe cheating, she orders the investigator to get to know the girl more. One night, Toni lets Marlyn's suitor, Jericho (Romnick Sarmienta) inside the house to talk to Marlyn. But while hiding, Jericho gets snatched by the monster, Marlyn is also missing.

The family concluded that Jericho and Marlyn ran away together or ‘tanan.’ Margarita confronts Abe in his workplace. Duke (Ronnel Victor), Toni's suitor is also consumed by monster when he visited Toni but he appears the next day and appears to be fine. Margarita, who disapproved of Duke sees him kneeling in front of the jar and disappears. The next morning, Margarita scolds at Toni for seeing Duke but she wakes away when she slaps Toni. During a conversation, Duke pulls Toni away from the jar and warns her. Margarita is suing Abe of Concubinage, as she gets more obsessed with Abe's crime, she finds out that one of the maids is Abe's mistress. She meets with the maid but during a confrontation the maid is snatched by the monster. Margarita witnesses it and escapes with her car. She wakes up the next day, hearing voices and scolded by a homeless man about her sin. Margarita decided to drop the case and makes amends with Abe, she even attempts to give him the jar. But as Abe inspects it, the monster snatches him. Toni gets home and sees her father's shoe and blood on the jar. She confronts Margarita and together they witness the monster getting out of the jar. Duke appears briefly before disappearing again. Explosion happens around the house prompting the two to run around and hide. When the chaos stopped, the two tries to escape but the door is locked, the remaining maids gets consumed by the monster who is now haunting Margarita and Toni in the living room. The two hides again in a room, and after a smoke covers Margarita, she reveals that she was always jealous of Toni's mother but before she can attack Toni, Duke appears to stop the monster, and asks to leave the two out of the fight. Margarita, now possessed by the monster brawls with Toni who is also possessed by Duke. When Toni gets the upper hand, the monster taunts her to kill her stepmother, but Toni is unwilling and gets defeated by her. The monster then tries to stab Toni, but a lightning strikes and defeats her. Toni wakes up to Duke revealing himself to be an angel and not the same Duke as before, he also reveals that everyone consumed by the monster are gone but reminds Toni to remain courteous and he will guide her.

Cast

Komiks 

 Ian De Leon as Cocoy (credited as Kristoffer Ian De Leon)
 Gina Pareño as Cocoy and Anna's mother
 Michael De Mesa as Argonox
 Ruel Vernal as Gorkrah
 Jaime Fabregas as Cocoy and Anna's father (credited as Jimmy Fabregas)
 Monossi Mempin as Nonoy
 Joanne Miller as Anna
 Vicky Suba as Couple Victim
 Jay Ilagan as Couple Victim (uncredited)

Halimaw sa Banga 

 Lotlot de Leon as Toni
 Liza Lorena as Margarita
 Mario O’Hara as Abe
 Maritess Guetirrez as Halimaw
 Mart Kenneth Rebamonte as Emo na Halimaw 
 Mary Walter as Grandmother
 Ronnel Victor as Duke
 Marilyn Villamayor as Marlyn
 Romnick Sarmienta as Jericho
 Nora Aunor as Regina, Toni's mother (photo only) (uncredited)
 Tony Angeles as Banga Seller (uncredited)

Awards
At the 1986 Metro Manila Film Festival, the film won 10 awards, including Mario O'Hara for Best Director and Best Actor, and Liza Lorena for Best Actress.

Legacy
The monster and the title itself; 'Halimaw sa Banga' is well known in the Philippines. Often included in list of scariest creatures from Philippine Cinema and mentioned as pop culture reference. The creature appeared in the superhero fantasy teleserye 'Super Inggo' portrayed by Ai-Ai delas Alas.

Matet de Leon, Ian and Lotlot's younger sister, uttered the words "Takot ako, eh!" ("I'm scared, eh!") in the trailer. This phrase is later included in the poster and even produced another horror film in 1987 with Mario O'hara directing again and the three siblings appearing together.

References

External links 
 

1986 films
Films directed by Mario O'Hara